Mi Hijita Linda (English: My cute little daughter) is the 22nd studio album by Mexican pop singer Yuri. It was released in early December 2008. The album has the participation of the singer Flex in the song La Múcura and it has several covers like the folk song "La bamba" and one of the most famous cumbia songs "La Pollera Colorá" (The red skirt).

Reception
Yuri returned with this new album under the supervision of EMI Televisa Music and four producers. However this comeback did not work, since the album was panned by critics and fans in general; most of the public blamed the label since there was not enough promotion to support the album equally in Mexico as outside Mexico.

Track listing
Tracks:

Production
 Executive producer and Art direction: Manuel Calderón
 Production: Luigi Giraldo, Gian Pietro Felisatti and Jorge Avendaño Lührs
 Label: EMI
 Year: 2008

Singles
 Mi hijita linda
 Ya no me ames (in United States)
 Estúpida romántica (in United States)

References

2008 albums
Yuri (Mexican singer) albums